is a Japanese footballer currently playing as a midfielder for Machida Zelvia.

Club career
Uno played football at the Aomori Yamada Junior High School, citing teammate Kuryu Matsuki as a rival, but also an inspiration to push himself harder. In November 2021, it was announced that Uno would join J2 League side Machida Zelvia for the 2022 season.

Career statistics

Club
.

Notes

References

2003 births
Living people
Association football people from Fukushima Prefecture
Japanese footballers
Association football midfielders
J2 League players
FC Machida Zelvia players